Camille Montes Rivero is a fictional character in the 2008 James Bond film Quantum of Solace portrayed by actress Olga Kurylenko.

In film
Camille is a Bolivian national. She first meets James Bond (Daniel Craig) in Haiti, where she intends to kill General Medrano (Joaquin Cosío), who murdered her entire family when she was a child. She sleeps with Dominic Greene (Mathieu Amalric), a member of the terrorist group Quantum, to get to Medrano, but Greene soon grows suspicious of her and plots to kill her.

Camille arranges a meeting with a geologist selling classified information that is detrimental to Greene's front company, Greene Planet. However, Greene has already hired assassin Edmund Slate (Neil Jackson) to pose as the geologist (whom Camille has not met in person) and kill Camille. Bond intercepts and kills Slate and takes his suitcase without knowing the contents. Camille spots Bond on the street with the suitcase and believes he is the geologist. Bond opens the suitcase and unwittingly reveals Slate's gun and documents that show Camille as a target.  Believing Bond has come to kill her, Camille attempts to shoot him before fleeing. She returns to Greene, intent on being introduced to Medrano, so she can kill him. When Greene betrays Camille, Bond rescues her, and they team up to go after Greene and Medrano.

Bond leaves Camille for a short period of time after she is knocked unconscious during a boat chase in Haiti to follow Greene to Austria, tracking him to a performance of Tosca. Camille soon appears at Greene's formal fundraising party to ruin it. Greene attempts to push her from a balcony but, once again, Bond saves her life.

Bond intervenes and takes her away from Greene, using MI6 Agent Strawberry Fields (Gemma Arterton) as a distraction, to prevent Greene's associate from following Bond and Camille as they leave the party; this costs Fields her life.  Camille watches Bond as he kills Bolivian police officers in cold blood as revenge for murdering his friend and ally Rene Mathis (Giancarlo Giannini).

Camille and Bond trace Greene and Medrano to a desert eco-hotel. While Bond goes to fight Greene and his men, Camille faces Medrano, who attempts to rape and kill her. Camille gets the upper hand, however, and kills the dictator with a single shot to the head. As the hotel collapses around them, Bond shields Camille from the fire, and helps her escape. Bond leaves Greene in the middle of the desert and drives Camille to a train station, so she can go back to her home. The two share a quick kiss, and Camille wishes Bond luck in conquering his personal demons.

Behind the scenes
Barbara Broccoli said that she intended for Camille to return for Skyfall or a future film. The character did not appear in Skyfall, however, nor the subsequent Bond films, Spectre and No Time to Die.

Analysis
Laurieann Gibson argued that Montes is "arguably a female version of Bond rather than a Bond girl". Gibson goes on to point out that her mission was accomplished first, whereas in previous Bond films, "women's individual missions were secondary to or subsumed by Bond's". Montes is also a rarity in that she does not have sex with Bond.

Chicago Sun-Times film critic Roger Ebert, who was critical of Quantum of Solace as a whole, compared Montes unfavorably to the more colorful Bond girls of previous films in the series, such as Goldfingers Pussy Galore, GoldenEyes Xenia Onatopp, and Diamonds Are Forevers Plenty O'Toole.

References

Bond girls
Orphan characters in film
Quantum of Solace
Film characters introduced in 2008
Fictional Bolivian people
Fictional female secret agents and spies
Fictional sole survivors